James Richard "J. R."

High school and college
Reynolds was born in Roanoke, Virginia to parents Laverne Alexander and Warren Reynolds. He has one sister.

His main position in high school was shooting guard but he learned to be a point guard in college. Reynolds attended Roanoke Catholic High School from 1999 to 2002. There he played on the basketball team, and played on three state-championship teams during those four years.

He transferred to Oak Hill Academy for his senior season in 2002–03.  He played on the Oak Hill basketball team, which was ranked number 4 in the United States in 2003.

Reynolds played on the University of Virginia (UVa) basketball team from 2003 to 2007. He was a top player there, and was among the top-ten scorers in the history of the UVa team.

Professional career
He has played for Martos Napoil in Italy, ASVEL in France, and Vanoli Soresina in Italy.

He played 3 games for the Maine Red Claws in the 2011–12 season.

In December 2012, he signed for Bnei HaSharon of the Israeli Basketball Super League.  For the 2013–14 season, Reynolds signed with Limoges CSP in the French LNB.

On August 6, 2014, he signed a one-year deal with Budućnost Podgorica of Montenegro.

On July 27, 2015, he signed a one-year deal with the Polish club Stelmet Zielona Góra. In late December 2015, he left Zielona Góra and signed with Torku Konyaspor for the rest of the season.

On July 6, 2016, Reynolds returned to Budućnost Podgorica, signing a one-year deal.

On October 17, 2017, Reynolds signed with BCM Gravelines, returning to the club for a second stint.

Career statistics

Domestic leagues

References

External links
NBA Draft profile
LNB Pro A profile

1984 births
Living people
ABA League players
American expatriate basketball people in France
American expatriate basketball people in Israel
American expatriate basketball people in Italy
American expatriate basketball people in Montenegro
American expatriate basketball people in Poland
American men's basketball players
ASVEL Basket players
Basket Zielona Góra players
Basketball players from Virginia
BCM Gravelines players
Bnei HaSharon players
KK Budućnost players
Limoges CSP players
Maine Red Claws players
Nuova AMG Sebastiani Basket Rieti players
Orléans Loiret Basket players
Pallacanestro Varese players
Point guards
Shooting guards
Sportspeople from Roanoke, Virginia
Torku Konyaspor B.K. players
Vanoli Cremona players
Virginia Cavaliers men's basketball players